Mechanics of the Brain is a 1926 Soviet documentary film directed by Vsevolod Pudovkin, a popularization of Ivan Pavlov's studies in classical conditioning. The picture is considered the first Russian popular science film. The motion picture is the first independent work of Pudovkin as a director and also marks the start of his collaboration with cinematographer Anatoli Golovnya.

Pudovkin joined Mezhrabpom-Rus film studio in 1925 and, as his first job, was assigned to make a popular science film about Ivan Pavlov's work. The filming started in May 1925 and proceeded for more than a year. The many delays were caused by constant shuttling between the Pavlov's laboratory in Leningrad and the film studio in Moscow as well as difficulties with filming conditioned animals who were easily distracted by the lights and sounds of filming process.

Twenty years later, Pudovkin told an interviewer:

Notes

References
.

External links

Soviet documentary films
Gorky Film Studio films
Soviet silent feature films
Soviet black-and-white films
Films directed by Vsevolod Pudovkin
1926 documentary films
1926 films
Black-and-white documentary films
Documentary films about psychology
Soviet popular science films